The Orange Line is a rapid transit line of the Washington Metro system, consisting of 26 stations in Fairfax County and Arlington, Virginia; the District of Columbia; and Prince George's County, Maryland, United States. The Orange Line runs from Vienna in Virginia to New Carrollton in Maryland. Half of the line's stations are shared with the Blue Line and over two thirds are shared with the Silver Line. Orange Line service began on November 20, 1978.

History 
Planning for Metro began with the Mass Transportation Survey in 1955, which attempted to forecast both freeway and mass transit systems sufficient to meet the needs of transportation in 1980. In 1959, the study's final report included two rapid transit lines which anticipated subways in downtown Washington. Because the plan called for extensive freeway construction within the District of Columbia, alarmed residents lobbied for federal legislation creating a moratorium on freeway construction through July 1, 1962. The National Capital Transportation Agency's 1962 Transportation in the National Capital Region report anticipated much of the present Orange Line route in Virginia with the route following the median strip of I-66 both inside Arlington and beyond. The route continued in rapid transit plans until the formation of the Washington Metropolitan Area Transit Authority (WMATA).

With the formation of WMATA in October 1966, planning of the system shifted from federal hands to a regional body with representatives of the District, Maryland and Virginia. Congressional route approval was no longer a key consideration. Instead, routes had to serve each local suburban jurisdiction to assure that they would approve bond referendums to finance the system. Because the least expensive way to build into the suburbs was to rely upon existing railroad right-of-ways, the Orange Line took much of its present form, except that it also featured a further extension along the railroad to Bowie, Maryland and along the Dulles Access Road to the Dulles Airport.

By 1966, WMATA and Arlington County planners had agreed "to realign the rapid transit through high-density commercial-office-apartment areas in the vicinity of Wilson Boulevard instead of the freeway's median between the river and Glebe Road." As a result of this agreement, the Orange Line follows in Arlington the former routes of an interurban electric trolley line, the Fairfax line and the North Arlington branch of the Washington, Arlington & Falls Church Railway, that had initially spurred those areas' development.

On March 1, 1968, WMATA approved its Adopted Regional System (ARS) plan that included suburban mass transit lines that followed the median of the proposed Interstate 66 through Virginia to Vienna and the CSX/Amtrak railroad right-of-way in Prince George's County, Maryland. The construction of the downtown Washington sections of the Orange and Blue lines began simultaneously with the Red line. A joint ground-breaking ceremony was held on December 9, 1969. Service on the joint downtown track was at first branded as just the Blue Line and commenced on July 1, 1977.

In 1976, Robert Patricelli, federal Urban Mass Transportation Administrator, ordered Metro to conduct an alternatives analysis of the portion of its system that was not already under contract. Because the Tysons Corner area of Fairfax County had developed significantly since the ARS was adopted in 1968, the analysis considered rerouting the Orange line to serve Tysons Corner at an additional cost of $60 million. However, because environmental impact statements had already been completed for the Vienna route, a change in the route would result in a five-year delay in the construction of the Orange Line west of Ballston. This prompted the City of Falls Church to sue WMATA for breach of contract. In the end, WMATA kept the Vienna route intact, leaving Tysons Corner without Metrorail service until 2014.

Service on the Orange Line began on November 20, 1978 between National Airport and New Carrollton, with five new stations being added to the existing network from Stadium–Armory. When the line from Rosslyn to Ballston–MU was completed on December 11, 1979, Orange Line trains began following this route rather than going to the National Airport station. The line was completed on June 7, 1986, when it was extended by four stations to Vienna in the I-66 median.

On January 13, 1982, an Orange Line train derailed as it was being backed up from an improperly closed rail switch between the Federal Triangle and Smithsonian stations, resulting in the deaths of three passengers. It was the first incident within the Metro system that caused a fatality, and the deadliest incident occurring in the system until the 2009 collision that resulted in nine fatalities.

Between 2011 and 2013, service was interrupted at stations west of Ballston on designated weekends to accommodate the construction of the interconnection of the Silver Line with the existing Orange Line tracks. As a part of this project, the train yard adjacent to the West Falls Church station on the Orange Line was expanded.

On July 26, 2014, Orange Line stations between East Falls Church and Stadium-Armory began to serve Silver Line trains.

All stations reopened on June 28, 2020.

The original plan called for trains to terminate at West Falls Church, but this was instead changed to Ballston due to effects of the ongoing COVID-19 pandemic and low ridership. Shuttle buses were provided to the closed stations. On August 16, 2020, all Orange line trains began terminating at  while bypassing . East Falls Church reopened on August 23, 2020. On September 8, 2020, Vienna and Dunn Loring stations reopened.

Between May 28 and September 5, 2022, all Orange Line trains were terminating at  station on weekdays and  station on weekends due to the Platform Improvement Project which closed stations north of  station. Shuttle buses are provided to all closed stations.

Route 

Starting at its western terminus at the Vienna/Fairfax-GMU station in Virginia, the tracks run on the median strip of Interstate 66 until they enter a tunnel under Fairfax Drive just before the Ballston-MU station. Although originally proposed to follow I-66 through Arlington, city planners successfully argued that the line be relocated to Fairfax Drive, which has since stimulated high rise development along the line's route. At the Clarendon station, the tunnel shifts to Wilson Blvd. and 16th Street North. The tunnel then turns north and merges with the Blue Line just before entering the Rosslyn station which is located under North Lynn Street. The tunnel continues under the Potomac River and bends to the east to travel under I Street NW in the District of Columbia.

The tunnel continues east under I Street and between Farragut West and McPherson Square stations there is a non-revenue branch track that connects with the Red Line. The tunnel then turns south under 12th Street Northwest and enters the lower level of the Metro Center station. After Smithsonian station, the tunnel turns east under D Street Southwest and then southeast under Pennsylvania Avenue Southeast. At Potomac Avenue station, the tunnel briefly travels under G Street Southeast and then turns northwest under Potomac Avenue with a turn to the north to travel under 19th Street Southeast for the Stadium-Armory station. The tunnel then travels under the RFK Stadium parking lots to surface near Benning Road. The elevated tracks follow Benning Road across the Anacostia River and then split from the Blue and Silver lines. There is a pocket track just west of this split.

The above ground tracks continue along DC Route 295 between Minnesota Avenue and Deanwood stations and then follow the CSX/Amtrak railroad in Prince George's County, Maryland to the eastern terminus at New Carrolton. The route includes a train yard adjacent to the West Falls Church station. Orange Line service travels along the entirety of the K Route (from the terminus at Vienna/Fairfax-GMU to the C & K junction just south of Rosslyn), part of the C Route (from the C & K junction just south of Rosslyn to Metro Center), and the entire D Route (from Metro Center to New Carrollton).

The Orange Line needs 30 trains (9 eight-car trains and 21 six-car trains, consisting of 198 rail cars) to run at peak capacity.

Stations 
The following stations are along the line, from west to east:

Future 
The Virginia Department of Transportation (VDOT) announced on January 18, 2008 that it and the Virginia Department of Rail and Public Transportation (VDPRT) had begun work on a draft environmental impact statement (EIS) for the I-66 corridor in Fairfax and Prince William counties. According to VDOT the EIS, officially named the I-66 Multimodal Transportation and Environment Study, would focus on improving mobility along I-66 from the Capital Beltway (I-495) interchange in Fairfax County to the interchange with U.S. Route 15 in Prince William County. The EIS also allegedly includes a four station extension of the Orange Line past Vienna. The extension would continue to run in the I-66 median and would have stations at Chain Bridge Road, Fair Oaks, Stringfellow Road and Centreville near Virginia Route 28 and U.S. Route 29. Also, plans to extend Orange Line to Bowie have been proposed. In its final report published June 8, 2012, the study and analysis revealed that an "extension would have a minimal impact on Metrorail ridership and volumes on study area roadways inside the Beltway and would therefore not relieve congestion in the study corridor."

References

Further reading

External links 

 world.nycsubway.org: Orange Line

 
Railway lines opened in 1978
Railway lines in highway medians